Abhishek Dudhaiya, also known as Mukesh Dudhaiya, is a  producer/director in Hindi TV serials and film. He has produced and directed over 20 TV shows like Ehsaas, Agneepath, Sinndoor Tere Naam Ka, Life Ka Recharge and Umeed Naye Subha Ki  among others.

Abhishek is presently the writer, director and producer of the multi starrer film Bhuj: The Pride of India  starring Ajay Devgn, Sanjay Dutt, Sonakshi Sinha, Nora Fatehi, Sharad Kelkar and Ammy Virk. Many reviews state including official sites of various OTT's, that BHUJ may be the biggest war film release of the year 2021. It is said so because it increased the app download percentage for Hotsar by manifolds.

Abhishek is also directing Sardarni, a biopic on Shaurya Chakra winner Amrik Kaur.

Abhishek Dudhaiya is honored with the title of Honorary Professor by NIMS University.

Abhishek Co-produced multiple award winning film I'm Gonna Tell God Everything.

Television
Director

Films

References

External links
 

Living people
Place of birth missing (living people)
Indian television producers
Year of birth missing (living people)
21st-century Indian film directors